Acrulia is a genus of beetles belonging to the family Staphylinidae.

The genus was first described by Thomson in 1858.

The species of this genus are found in Europe and Northern America.

Species:
 Acrulia angusticollis Reitter, 1909
 Acrulia inflata (Gyllenhal, 1813)

References

Staphylinidae
Staphylinidae genera